Magomet Khasanovich Shavayev (born 19 January 1995) is a Russian football player.

Club career
He made his debut in the Russian Professional Football League for FC Avangard Kursk on 22 October 2013 in a game against FC Spartak-2 Moscow. He made his Russian Football National League debut for PFC Spartak Nalchik on 13 November 2016 in a game against FC Shinnik Yaroslavl.

References

1995 births
Sportspeople from Kursk
Living people
Russian footballers
Association football midfielders
PFC Spartak Nalchik players
FC Avangard Kursk players